Big Knife may refer to:

 The Big Knife, 1955 American film
 The Big Knife (play), 1949 American play by Clifford Odets
 Big Knife Provincial Park, a small provincial park in central Alberta, Canada
 Osla Big Knife, an Anglo-Saxon King of Kent, 6th century
 Sami knife, Sami for big knife, a long, wide blade traditionally used by the Sami people

See also
 Big Knives
 The Small Knives